Boots Met My Face is the debut studio album by the Scottish indie pop band Admiral Fallow. Written by the band between 2006 and 2009, it was released in April 2010 by Blantyre-based studios Chem19. The album was produced in association with Paul Savage, the former drummer of indie rock band The Delgados.

Background
Lead singer and main writer Louis Abbott has said that "All of the songs document the first chapter of my life, be it memories from school or kicking a ball about with my childhood chums. All are taken from real life events. There's no fiction. I'm not into making up stories or characters for the sake of trying to stir emotions. They are songs about friends and family as well as a fair bit of self-evaluation". Funding for the album was assisted by Creative Scotland. The album was also released internationally, through Indigo Records. The album art is a photo taken at Salen Bay at the Isle of Mull.

Critical reception

The album was met with very positive reviews. Mike Diver for the BBC stated "surprising and enthralling, entrancing through simplicity, through finely crafted material played superbly well. It is, probably, the best album of folk-goes-indie-with-a-Scottish-accent since The Great Eastern. The band never over-stretches itself; Abbott never sings as if his life truly depends on it. And he’s right to do so: there are more important things in this world than songs, of course. But there are plenty of songs here that will perfectly complement the significant moments in your own life."

Neil Ashman March for Drowned in Sound said: "Abbot has described the record as being informed by the experiences of his youth and those he knows and on the whole it is a record suggestive of a reflective, varied and ambivalent view of the past as opposed to an altogether turbulent one. It proves Admiral Fallow, and in particular Louis Abbott, to be endowed with enough melodic, lyrical and compositional talent to believe that their best is still to come."

Track listing

Personnel
Louis Abbott – guitar, lyricist, vocals
Kevin Brolly – clarinet, drums, piano, vocals
Phillip Hague – drums, vibraphone, vocals
Sarah Hayes – flute, piano, vocals
Johan Hentze – trumpet
Davur Magnussen – trombone
Annemarie McGahon – viola
Fiona McLachlan – cello
Tom Poulson – trumpet
Joe Rattray – bass (upright), vocals
Katie Rush – violin
Fraser Russell – tuba
Gordon Skene – guitar, vocals
Tom Stearn – guitar
Alex Trotter – trombone

References

2010 debut albums
Indie pop albums by Scottish artists